Amelia Josephine “A J” Hurt (born December 5, 2000 in Truckee, California) is an American World Cup alpine ski racer. She made her World Cup debut in October 2018 in Sölden, Austria, and competed in the World Championships in 2021.

She has qualified to represent the United States at the 2022 Winter Olympics.

World Cup results

Season standings

Top twenty results

World Championship results

United States Championships

United States giant slalom champion in 2018
United States slalom champion in 2020
United States combined champion in 2018

References

External links
 

 
 AJ Hurt at U.S. Ski Team

American female alpine skiers
2000 births
Living people
21st-century American women
People from Truckee, California
Alpine skiers at the 2022 Winter Olympics
Olympic alpine skiers of the United States